The BL 8 inch gun Mark VIII was the main battery gun used on the Royal Navy's  cruisers, in compliance with the Washington Naval Treaty of 1922. The 10,000 ton limit was a major factor in design decisions such as turrets and gun mountings. A similar gun formed the main battery of Spanish  cruisers. In 1930, the Royal Navy adopted the BL 6 inch Mk XXIII naval gun as the standard cruiser main battery in preference to this 8-inch gun.

Description
These guns, 50 calibres long, were built-up guns which consisted of a wire-wound tube encased within a second tube and jacket with a Welin breech block and hydraulic or hand-operated Asbury mechanism.  Two cloth bags each containing  of cordite were used to fire a  projectile.  Mark I turrets allowed gun elevation to 70 degrees to fire high-explosive shells against aircraft.  Hydraulic pumps proved incapable of providing sufficient train and elevation speed to follow contemporary aircraft; so simplified version of the Mark II turrets with a maximum elevation of 50 degrees were installed in the '.  Each gun could fire approximately five rounds per minute.  Useful life expectancy was 550 effective full charges (EFC) per barrel.

Naval service
The following ships mounted Mk VIII guns in 188-tonne twin turrets.  The standard main battery was four turrets, but Exeter and York carried only three to reduce weight and formed the separate York class.
  heavy cruisers : 13 ships
 Canarias-class heavy cruisers : 2 ships
 York-class heavy cruisers : 2 ships

Coast defence guns

Six single guns capable of elevating to 70 degrees were installed as coastal artillery in the Folkestone-Dover area during the Second World War.

Ammunition

Shell trajectory
Range with 256 lbs. (116.1) SAPC with MV = 2,725 fps (831 mps)

See also

Weapons of comparable role, performance and era
203mm/50 Modèle 1924 gun French equivalent
20.3 cm SK C/34 Naval gun German equivalent
203 mm /53 Italian naval gun Italian equivalent
20 cm/50 3rd Year Type naval gun Japanese equivalent
8"/55 caliber gun US equivalent

Surviving examples
 A gun from HMAS Australia outside the Australian War Memorial, Canberra

Notes

References

Bibliography

External links

 Tony DiGiulian, Britain 8"/50 (20.3 cm) Mark VIII
 Terry Gander, Twentieth century British coast defence guns

Naval guns of the United Kingdom
Coastal artillery
203 mm artillery
World War II naval weapons of the United Kingdom
Military equipment introduced in the 1920s